The Netherlands Football League Championship 1905–1906 was contested by sixteen teams participating in two divisions. The national champion would be determined by a play-off featuring the winners of the eastern and western football division of the Netherlands. HBS Craeyenhout won this year's championship by beating PW 3-2 and 4–2.

Divisions

Eerste Klasse East

Eerste Klasse West

Championship play-off

HBS Craeyenhout won the championship.

References
RSSSF Netherlands Football League Championships 1898-1954
RSSSF Eerste Klasse Oost
RSSSF Eerste Klasse West

Netherlands Football League Championship seasons
1905 in Dutch sport
1906 in Dutch sport